, a.k.a. The Princess of Badger Palace, is a 1958 color (Eastmancolor) Japanese Musical film directed by Kōzō Saeki.

Production designer was Kazuo Okawa, sound recordist was Kanji Nakano and lighting technician was Kazuo Shimomura.

Cast 
 Hibari Misora - Tanukichiro
 Izumi Yukimura - KInutahime	
 Ichirō Arishima - Tanukizaemon
 Bokuzen Hidari - Awanokami
 Momoko Kōchi
 Yumi Shirakawa - Ocho
 Kenji Sahara
 Tony Tani
 Shinji Yamada
 Keiko Awaji 
 Chōchō Miyako
 Daimaru Nakata
 Rocket Nakata

References

External links
 
 

1958 films
Films directed by Kozo Saeki
Films about badgers
1950s Japanese films
Japanese drama films